Environment is a 1927 Australian silent film about a woman who poses for a revealing painting. It was one of two films produced by Vaughan C. Marshall, the other one being Caught in the Net (1928).

Unlike many Australian silent films, a copy of it survives today.

Plot
Mary Garval is forced by poverty into posing semi-nude for a painting, L'Environment. The painter's assistant, Arthur, tries to seduce her but she runs away after finding out he is married.

Mary seeks refuge in the country and falls for a farmer, Jimmy. They get married but Arthur, seeking revenge, sends a Jewish friend to spy on them. He sends Jimmy a copy of the painting as a wedding present. Jimmy eventually forgives Mary and decides to destroy the painting, but discovers a lost will in the frame, which reveals Mary to be the heiress to a lost fortune.

Cast
Beth Darvall as Mary Garval
Hal Percy as James Denison
Colin Campbell as Arthur Huston
Alf Scarlett as James Masterton
Arthur Bruce as James Garval
Jim Joyce as Wilfred Garval
Dorothy May as Mrs Huston
Max Sorelle as Mr Eltham
Kitty Mostyn as Mrs Eltham
Viva Vawden as Mrs Harrop
Charles Brown as Henry Harrop
George Gilbert as Hal Hawkins
Edward Landor as Abe Halstein
Phyllis Best as Biddy O'Rooke

Production
The movie was shot in early 1927 in and around Melbourne, particularly in the suburb of Hawthorn. Marshall tried to woo Melbourne society while making the film, looking for investment. The director, Gerald Haye, made industrial films in Melbourne for several years.

Reception
The film appears to have only been screened in Victoria.

References

External links

Environment at National Film and Sound Archive

1927 films
Australian drama films
Australian silent feature films
Australian black-and-white films
1927 drama films
Films directed by Gerald M. Hayle
Silent drama films
1920s English-language films